Alexander H. Popkin, Ph.D. (November 7, 1913 – January 23, 1987) was an American scientist and inventor with 33 US patents and 18 scientific publications.

Early life and education 

Popkin was born in New York City, on the lower east side of Manhattan. He received a B.S. in chemistry from Brooklyn College in 1934, an M.S. in organic chemistry from Pennsylvania State University in 1935, and a  Ph.D. in organic chemistry from Pennsylvania State University in 1939. He was a member of the honorary societies of Sigma Xi and Phi Lambda Upsilon.

Career

Sun Chemical Company 
Dr. Popkin began his career at Sun Chemical Company, working there from 1939 - 1945. He was group head in charge of organic research on new pigments, dyes, and resins for use in printing ink formulations. During World War II, there was a major effort related to new pigments, dyes, and resins from non-critical raw materials. He was involved in confidential research for the National Defense Research Committee (NDRC), and he was added to American Men of Science in 1944.

Maltbie Chemical Company 
In 1945 he became director of research at Maltbie Chemical Company with responsibility for the supervision and coordination of organic research and pharmaceutical development, and an advisor to the export department on matters relating to foreign registry of company products, and advisor to the advertising department on matters of dosage forms and labeling.

Esso Research and Engineering Company (formerly Standard Oil Development Company) 
From 1946 - 1968, Popkin worked at Esso Research and Engineering Company, Linden, NJ in research and development in the areas of motor lubricants, lubricant additives, gasolines, gasoline additives, aviation lubricants, new applications for asphalts related to water conservation and materials of construction, as well as studies in air pollution.

Between 1947 and 1970, he obtained 33 US patents as the inventor or co-inventor. The patents were assigned to the following companies: Sun Chemical Company (4 patents), Standard Oil Development Company (9 patents), and Esso Research and Engineering Company (20 patents). His inventions included a major gasoline additive, first Esso commercial low-cost aviation synthetic jet engine lubricant, first Esso military low-cost aviation synthetic jet engine lubricant, two major Esso aviation mineral oil piston engine lubricants, and two major Esso motor oil additives. Some of these inventions were developed into Uniflo Motor Oil 5W-20, a new synthetic lubricant for car and truck engines, and Esso Extra Gasoline containing a detergent additive, which was marketed and advertised as "Put a Tiger in Your Tank."

After taking early retirement from Esso in 1968, he continued working for Esso as a consultant doing research projects in the US Patent office in Washington, DC.

Esso Research and Engineering became Exxon and then ExxonMobil.

US Patents

Publications 

 "Sterols. X. Cholesterol Derivatives," Journal of the American Chemical Society, April 1, 1937 
 "The Action of Primary Grignard Reagents on t-Butylacetyl Chloride," Journal of the American Chemical Society, October 1, 1938 
 "Isomerization during the Preparation of n-Amyl Chloride," Journal of the American Chemical Society, October 1, 1938 
 "The Reducing Action of Primary Grignard Reagents with Trimethylacetyl Chloride," Journal of the American Chemical Society, November 1, 1938 
 "The Action of Primary Grignard Reagents with t-Butylacetyl Chloride. II¹, Journal of the American Chemical Society, November 1, 1938
 "The Common Basis of Intramolecular Rearrangements. VI.¹ Reactions of Neopentyl Iodide," Journal of the American Chemical Society, June 1, 1939
 "Reaction of Neopentyl Chloride with Sodium," Journal of the American Chemical Society, June 1, 1939
 "Attempted Separation of Isomeric Hexenes by Fractional Distillation," Journal of the American Chemical Society, April 1, 1940
 "The Common Basis of Intramolecular Rearrangements. VII.¹ Inapplicability of a Free Radical Mechanism. Formation of 1,1-DimethylcyclopropAerane and Neopentane by the Action of Sodium on Neopentyl Chloride. Relation to the Mechanism of the Wurtz Reaction," Journal of the American Chemical Society, January 1, 1941
 "Grignard Reductions. IX.¹’²’³ Further Studies on the Reduction of Acid Halides," Journal of the American Chemical Society, March 1, 1941
 "Additions and Corrections. The Reducing Action of Primary Grignard Reagents with Trimethylacetyl Chloride," Journal of the American Chemical Society, December 1, 1942
 "Derivatives of Biphenylsulfonamides. I. Preparation of p-(o-Aminophenyl)-benzenesulfonamide,¹" Journal of the American Chemical Society, November 1, 1943 
 "Derivatives of Biphenylsulfonamide. II.¹ Derivatives of p-(o-Aminophenyl)-benzenesulfonamide,²" Journal of the American Chemical Society, November 1, 1943 
 "Orientation in the Biphenyl System. The Preparation of 2- and 4-Aminobiphenyl-4'-sulfonamides," Journal of the American Chemical Society, May 1, 1944 
 "Orientation in the Biphenyl System.¹ Derivatives of 2-P.²" Journal of the American Chemical Society, May 1, 1944
 "Dibasic Acid Esters," Synthetic Lubricants, Reinhold Publishing Corporation, New York, NY, 1962 
 "New Roles for Asphalt in Controlling Man's Environment," National Petroleum Refiners Association, Tech. AM-67-16, San Antonio, Texas, April 3–5, 1967
 "Low Cost Drinking Water from Asphalt Catchments," International Conference on Water for Peace, Washington, DC, 1968

Professional Associations and Activities 

 American Chemical Society, 1937 - 1987 (Elected to the position of Area V representative for the Division of Petroleum Chemistry of the American Chemical Society in 1966.) 
 Society of Automotive Engineers, 1952 - 1970
 Chemists' Club, 1939 - 1947
 Association of Research Directors, Co-founder; Secretary-Treasurer, 1945 - 1948

References 

1913 births
1987 deaths
American inventors
American chemists